Below is a list of national squads who played in the 1959 African Cup of Nations.

Egypt

Coach:  Pál Titkos
|

Ethiopia
Coach:  Jiří Starosta
|

Sudan

Coach:  József Háda
|

External links
African Nations Cup 1959 - Details and Scorers RSSSF
CAN 1959
Egyptian Results in African Cup of Nations

Africa Cup of Nations squads
Squads